The University of Babylon (Arabic: جامعة بابل) is a university located in Babylon, Iraq. It consists of 20 colleges within three compounds, located seven kilometers south of the city of  Hillah, in Babylon Province. The campus was originally the Administrative Institute of Babylon. Later some of the buildings were adopted for use by the medical college of the University of Kufa, before being established as a university in its own right in 1991.

The university now teaches a wide variety of subjects, and during the 1990s, started teaching night classes. These became popular, especially among well-off families, after the increase in difficulty of high school examinations in 1997.

It publishes the Journal of University of Babylon and  Medical Journal of Babylon.

Student body
The university attracts students from various regions. The largest part of the student body is made up of students from Babylon Province. It also attracts numerous students from Karbala, Baghdad, Diwaniyah, Kufa and Najaf.

The university has a student-run newspaper. Plays produced by students of the College of Fine Arts are performed both internally and in national events and forums. University alumni have powers to elect staff.

Colleges
The university is split into twenty colleges, which are as follows:

 College of Agriculture
 College of Arts
 College of Basic Education
 College of Computer Technology
 College of Dentistry
 College of Education (Jābir ibn Hayyān)
 College of Education (Ṣafī al-Dīn)
 College of Engineering
 College of Fine Arts
 College of Law
 College of Management and Economics
 College of Material Engineering
 College of Medicine
 College of Medicine of Hamorabi
 College of Nursing
 College of Pharmacy
 College of Physical Education
 College of Qur'anic Studies
 College of Science
 College of Science for Woman
 College of Veterinary Medicine

References

External links
Official Website 
 Official Website 
 Journal of University of Babylon

Babylon
Babylon
1991 establishments in Iraq